Wetan may refer to:
Wetan Island
Wetan language
Autan, also known as Wetan, a village in Syria